PP-29 Gujrat-II is a Constituency of Provincial Assembly of Punjab.

2018 Elections

General elections are scheduled to be held on 25 July 2018.

See also
 PP-28 Gujrat-I
 PP-30 Gujrat-III

References

Provincial constituencies of Punjab, Pakistan